Hylophorbus tetraphonus is a species of frog in the family Microhylidae.
It is endemic to West Papua, Indonesia.
Its natural habitat is subtropical or tropical moist lowland forests.
It is threatened by habitat loss.

Sources

Hylophorbus
Amphibians of Western New Guinea
Amphibians described in 2001
Taxonomy articles created by Polbot